Jeremy Jones (born January 14, 1975) is an American professional snowboarder and businessman who is the founder of Jones Snowboards. In addition to creating and improving his line of snowboards, Jones works to create films that record his climbing and snowboarding adventures around the world. In November 2012, Jones was selected by National Geographic as a nominee for Adventurer of the Year, based on his "remarkable achievements in exploration, conservation, humanitarianism, and adventure sports." Jones is also the founder of the non-profit group, Protect Our Winters, which works to reduce the effects of global climate change by means of educational, activist and community-based projects. He is sponsored by: O'Neill, POC, CLIF Bar, Scott, Giro, 661 and Blue Bird Wax.

Early life
Jones grew up in various parts of the New England region of the United States, including Massachusetts, Vermont, and Maine. He attended Carrabassett Valley Academy in Carrabassett Valley, Maine and graduated in 1993. He started snowboarding in 1984, he was sponsored by Rossignol in 1989, and he became a professional snowboarder two years later in 1991.

Career 
After racing for many years, Jones focused his efforts on big mountain snowboarding, particularly in Alaska. His snowboarding style was a seminal influence on modern freeriding, and today Jones is regarded as a pioneer of professional big mountain riding.

Jones regularly rides with Xavier de Le Rue, Jonas Emery, Mads Jonsson, Victoria Jealouse and Johan Olofsson. The Jones snowboards team consists of Jonaven Moore, Ryland Bell, Forrest Shearer, Miikka Hast and Ralph Backstorm. Jeremy regularly participates in the Swatch O'Neill Big Mountain Pro tour.

In 2007 Jones founded Protect Our Winters (POW), a non-profit organization dedicated to reversing the global warming crisis by uniting the winter sports community and focusing its collective efforts towards reversing the damage done by climate change. As a testament to Jones' commitment to the environment, he has recently decided to forego the use of helicopters and lifts, opting instead to hike as his sole means of transportation on the slopes.

In 2009 Jones left his original snowboard sponsor Rossignol and announced his own line of snowboards tailored for big mountain and backcountry riding, Jones Snowboards. They were available as of the 2013/2014 season and have a significant share of the growing splitboard market.

Personal life 
Jones lives in Truckee, California, with his wife, Tiffany, who is a real estate agent in the Lake Tahoe area. He has two children.

Filmography

Film

Television

References

External links
Jeremy Jones on preserving Wilderness Jeremy's take on why wilderness matters, including an exclusive video produced by Teton Gravity Research.
Jeremy Jones on Go211.com Exclusive photos, videos and blogs submitted by Jeremy.
nthWORD article Winter Running Dry by Shanie Matthew Story of Protect our Winters (POW), founded by Jeremy Jones.
Posts tagged 'Jeremy Jones' on SuperStoker
Jeremy Jones Snowboards

1975 births
Living people
American male snowboarders
Snowboarding
20th-century American people
21st-century American people
People from Olympic Valley, California